The Communauté de communes du Val de Noye  is a former communauté de communes in the Somme département and in the Picardie région of France. It was created in May 2001. It was merged into the new Communauté de communes Avre Luce Noye in January 2017.

Composition 
This communauté de communes comprised 26 communes:

Ailly-sur-Noye
Aubvillers
Chaussoy-Epagny
Chirmont
Cottenchy
Coullemelle
Dommartin
Esclainvillers
La Faloise
Flers-sur-Noye
Folleville
Fouencamps
Fransures
Grivesnes
Guyencourt-sur-Noye
Hallivillers
Jumel
Lawarde-Mauger-l'Hortoy
Louvrechy
Mailly-Raineval
Quiry-le-Sec
Rogy
Rouvrel
Sauvillers-Mongival
Sourdon
Thory

See also 
Communes of the Somme department

References 

Val de Noye